Carlo Bolognini (1678 – 1704) was an Italian painter of the Baroque period. He was mentioned in the Abecedario Pittorico of Padre Orlandi, was born at Bologna in 1678 (though Zani says 1662), and was first a pupil of Mauro Aldrovandini, then worked with Giulio Trogli. He excelled in painting quadratura, and was much employed at Vienna. One of his pupils was Lorenzo Bergonzoni (1646-1722).

References

1704 deaths
17th-century Italian painters
Italian male painters
18th-century Italian painters
Painters from Bologna
Italian Baroque painters
Quadratura painters
1678 births
18th-century Italian male artists